The 1965 Mexican Grand Prix was a Formula One motor race held at Ciudad Deportiva Magdalena Mixhuca in Mexico City on October 24, 1965. It was race 10 of 10 in both the 1965 World Championship of Drivers and the 1965 International Cup for Formula One Manufacturers. The race was won by Richie Ginther, who took his first and only victory, first for the Honda team and, excluding the Indianapolis 500, first win for the non-European team, after leading for the entire race. The Brabham-Climax of Dan Gurney finished the race second and the Lotus-Climax of Mike Spence completed the podium.

Race report 

The Mexican Grand Prix provided a host of new records - the last race of the 1500cc era was the only one of the season not to be won by a British-powered car and also the only race not to be won by a British driver. Honda's testing proved to be of benefit as Jim Clark and Graham Hill dropped out with engine problems and Jackie Stewart retired with clutch problems to leave Dan Gurney as the only challenger to Richie Ginther. Lorenzo Bandini and Pedro Rodríguez collided at the hairpin, leaving Ginther to stroll home for Honda's first, and his only, Grand Prix win. Goodyear also bowed out of Formula One in winning form. Gurney and Mike Spence took the other podium places, with Jo Siffert, Ronnie Bucknum and Richard Attwood completing the points scorers.

Classification

Qualifying

Race

Championship standings after the race 

Drivers' Championship standings

Constructors' Championship standings

 Notes: Only the top five positions are included for both sets of standings. Only best 6 results counted toward the championship. Numbers without parentheses are championship points, numbers in parentheses are total points scored.

References

Mexican Grand Prix
Mexican Grand Prix
1965 in Mexican motorsport
October 1965 sports events in Mexico